The Real End of the Great War is the English title for Prawdziwy koniec wielkiej wojny, a film released in 1957, directed by Jerzy Kawalerowicz.

Plot
Roza (Lucyna Winnicka) marries a promising young architect, Juliusz (Roland Glowacki). They have a blissful life together for the first few months, but then World War II breaks out and Juliusz is deported to a concentration camp soon after. Months and years go by, and Roza gradually abandons any hope that her husband might return. She meets and falls in love with another man, and tries to put her life back together, but one day, unexpectedly, Juliusz does return - a shattered ghost of his former self, physically crippled and tormented by memories of the camps. First out of duty, and then out of pity, Roza starts to care for him, but her feelings slowly transform into a kind of revulsion.

Kawalerowicz here takes up a theme that would be frequently addressed by later Polish films: the lingering psychological and emotional scars wrought by the war, a kind of weight from the past impeding the creation of any kind of future.

See also 
Cinema of Poland
List of Polish language films

External links

1957 films
Polish drama films
Films directed by Jerzy Kawalerowicz
1950s Polish-language films
1957 drama films